Tapejaridae (from a Tupi word meaning "the old being") are a family of pterodactyloid pterosaurs from the Cretaceous period. Members are currently known from Brazil, England, Hungary, Morocco, Spain, the United States, and China. The most primitive genera were found in China, indicating that the family has an Asian origin.

Description

Tapejarids were small to medium-sized pterosaurs with several unique, shared characteristics, mainly relating to the skull. Most tapejarids possessed a bony crest arising from the snout (formed mostly by the premaxillary bones of the upper jaw tip). In some species, this bony crest is known to have supported an even larger crest of softer, fibrous tissue that extends back along the skull. Tapejarids are also characterized by their large nasoantorbital fenestra, the main opening in the skull in front of the eyes, which spans at least half the length of the entire skull in this family. Their eye sockets were small and pear-shaped. Studies of tapejarid brain cases show that they had extremely good vision, more so than in other pterosaur groups, and probably relied nearly exclusively on vision when hunting or interacting with other members of their species. Tapejarids had unusually reduced shoulder girdles that would have been slung low on the torso, resulting in wings that protruded from near the belly rather than near the back, a "bottom decker" arrangement reminiscent of some planes.

Biology
Tapejarids appear to have been arboreal, having more curved claws than other azhdarchoid pterosaurs and occurring more commonly in fossil sites with other arboreal flying vertebrates such as early birds. Tapejarids have long been speculated as having been frugivores or omnivores, based on their parrot-like beaks. Direct evidence for plant-eating is known in a specimen of Sinopterus that preserves seeds in the abdominal cavity. The Barremian-
Aptian distribution of some tapejarids may even be partially associated with the first radiation phase of the angiosperms, especially of the genus Klitzschophyllites which represents a more basal angiosperm.

Assuming thalassodromines are tapejarids, this clade also included raptorial, macropredatory species adapted to hunt proportionally large prey.

Classification

Tapejaridae was defined by Alexander Kellner in 1989 as the clade containing both Tapejara and Tupuxuara, plus all descendants of their most recent common ancestor. As originally conceived, it was composed of two subfamilies: the Tapejarinae, consisting of Tapejara and its close relatives, and the Thalassodrominae, consisting of Thalassodromeus and Tupuxuara.

Some studies, such as one by Lü and colleagues in 2008, have found that the thalassodromines are more closely related to the azhdarchids proper than to the tapejarids, and have placed them in their own family (which has sometimes been referred to as Tupuxuaridae, though Thalassodrominae was named first). At least one study has also found that the Chaoyangopteridae, often found to be closer to azhdarchids, represent a lineage within the Tapejaridae, more closely related to the tapejarines than to the thalassodromines. Felipe Pinheiro and colleagues (2011) reclassified the group as a subfamily of Tapejaridae, Chaoyangopterinae, for this reason.

The exact relationships of tapejarids to one another and to other azhdarchoid pterosaurs has historically been unclear, with different studies producing significantly different cladograms (family trees). It is also unclear exactly which pterosaurs belong to the Tapejaridae; some researchers have found the thalassodromines and chaoyangopterines to be members of this family, while other studies have found them to be more closely related to the azhdarchids (in the clade Neoazhdarchia). Several studies have shown that the "tapejarids" as traditionally thought of (that is, including the classic examples of both Tapejara and Tupuxuara) are paraphyletic, and do not form a natural group, but instead represent sequential branches of the tree leading. In light of this discovery, several of the traditional names associated with the group have been re-defined. Martill and Naish proposed a revised definition for Tapejaridae, as all species more closely related to Tapejara than to Quetzalcoatlus. Andres and colleagues did not follow this proposal, instead formally defining Tapejaridae as the clade Tapejara + Sinopterus. They also re-defined the Tapejarinae as all species closer to Tapejara than to Sinopterus, and added a new clade, Tapejarini, to include all descendants of the last common ancestor of Tapejara and Tupandactylus.

Below are two alternate cladograms: the first, presented by Andres and colleagues in 2014, found the a grouping of tapejarids at the base of the clade, with thalassodromines more closely related to azhdarchids, chaoyangopterids, and dsungaripterids, all of them within the group Neoazhdarchia. Their cladogram is shown on the left. Later however, a number of studies had begun to favor Kellner's defition of the group, meaning that the members of the Thalassodrominae were reclassified within this group. An example of one of these studies is the one by Kellner and colleagues in 2019. The cladogram on the right shows their phylogenetic analysis. In 2021 a new study focus on the most complete Tapejaridae, a skeleton Tupandactylus navigans, confirmed the 2019  topology.

Topology 1: Andres and colleagues (2014).

Topology 2: Kellner and colleagues (2019).

References

Tapejaromorphs
Early Cretaceous first appearances
Late Cretaceous extinctions
Prehistoric reptile families